Robert Maurice Alers Hankey, 2nd Baron Hankey,  (4 July 1905 – 28 October 1996) was a British diplomat and public servant.

Background and education
Hankey was the eldest son of Maurice Hankey, 1st Baron Hankey, and Adeline, daughter of Abraham de Smidt, of South Africa. He was educated at Rugby and New College, Oxford.

Diplomatic career
Hankey was appointed to be a Third Secretary in 1928, a Second Secretary in 1932, and a First Secretary in 1939. He then served as the Envoy to Hungary from 1951 to 1953 and the Ambassador to Sweden between 1954 and 1960.

Hankey was a delegate to the Organisation for Economic Co-operation (renamed the Organisation for Economic Co-operation and Development (OECD) in 1961) between 1960 and 1965. He succeeded his father in the barony in 1963 and became a very active member of the House of Lords, speaking 552 times between 1965 and his last speech in December 1991 at the age of 86. Hankey was also involved in business and served as a director of the Alliance Building Society from 1970 to 1983. He was president of the Anglo-Swedish Society around 1970.

Family
Lord Hankey was twice married. He married firstly Frances Bevyl, daughter of Walter Erskine Stuart-Menteth, in 1930. They had two sons and two daughters. After her death in 1957 he married secondly Joanna, daughter of Reverend James Johnstone Wright, in 1962. Lord Hankey died in October 1996, aged 91, and was succeeded in the barony by his eldest son, Donald. He was also father of Adele Änggård.

Honours
Hankey was appointed to the Order of St Michael and St George as a Companion in the 1947 New Year Honours and promoted to a Knight Commander of the same Order in 1955. Sir Robert was appointed to the Royal Victorian Order as a Knight Commander in 1956, as well as being awarded the Grand Cross of the Order of the Polar Star of Sweden.

References

1905 births
1996 deaths
People educated at Rugby School
Alumni of New College, Oxford
2
Diplomatic peers
Knights Commander of the Order of St Michael and St George
Knights Commander of the Royal Victorian Order
Ambassadors of the United Kingdom to Sweden
Permanent Representatives of the United Kingdom to the OECD